James Theodore Workman (April 30, 1908 – October 15, 1983) was an American rower, born in Woodward, Oklahoma, who competed in the 1928 Summer Olympics.

In 1928, he was part of the American boat, which won the gold medal in the eights.

External links
 
 
 
 

1908 births
1983 deaths
People from Woodward, Oklahoma
American male rowers
Rowers at the 1928 Summer Olympics
Olympic gold medalists for the United States in rowing
Medalists at the 1928 Summer Olympics